The 2013 Sony Open Tennis (also known as 2013 Miami Masters), a men's and women's tennis tournament, was the 29th edition of the Miami Masters event and played on outdoor hard courts at the Tennis Center at Crandon Park in Miami. The tournament was held from March 18 to 31, 2013, and was part of the 2013 ATP World Tour and the 2013 WTA Tour, classified as an ATP World Tour Masters 1000 and a Premier Mandatory event, respectively.

Points and prize money

Point distribution

Prize money
The total commitment prize money for this year's event was $5,185,625 each (WTA Tour and ATP World Tour).

Players

Men's singles

Seeds

 1 Rankings are as of March 18, 2013.

Other entrants
The following players received wildcards into the main draw:
  James Blake
  Christian Harrison
  Lleyton Hewitt
  Denis Kudla 
  Guido Pella

The following player received entry using a protected ranking into the main draw:
  Somdev Devvarman

The following players received entry from the qualifying draw:
  Marius Copil
  Frank Dancevic
  Thiemo de Bakker
  Marc Gicquel
  Robby Ginepri
  Jan Hájek
  Rajeev Ram
  Olivier Rochus
  Guillaume Rufin
  Dudi Sela
  Tim Smyczek

The following players received entry as lucky losers:
  Daniel Brands
  Édouard Roger-Vasselin

Withdrawals
Before the tournament 
  Marcos Baghdatis → replaced by  João Sousa
  Brian Baker → replaced by  Carlos Berlocq
  Roger Federer → replaced by  Somdev Devvarman
  Mardy Fish → replaced by  Ričardas Berankis
  Christian Harrison (ankle injury) → replaced by  Daniel Brands
  Feliciano López (wrist injury) → replaced by  Édouard Roger-Vasselin
  Paul-Henri Mathieu → replaced by  David Nalbandian
  Rafael Nadal → replaced by  Tatsuma Ito
  Andy Roddick → replaced by  Jesse Levine
  Radek Štěpánek → replaced by  Blaž Kavčič
  Stanislas Wawrinka (arm and back injury) → replaced by  Tobias Kamke
During the tournament
  Milos Raonic (strep throat)
  Dmitry Tursunov (gastroenteritis)

Retirements
  Roberto Bautista Agut (stomach muscle pain)
  Carlos Berlocq (knee injury)
  Simone Bolelli (wrist injury)
  Tatsuma Ito (cramping)
  Andrey Kuznetsov (hip injury)
  Leonardo Mayer (back injury)

Men's doubles

Seeds

1 Rankings as of March 18, 2013.

Other entrants
The following pairs received wildcards into the doubles main draw:
  Christian Harrison /  Ryan Harrison
  Lleyton Hewitt /  Bernard Tomic

Withdrawals
During the tournament 
  Thomaz Bellucci (left hip injury)

Women's singles

Seeds

 Rankings are as of March 18, 2013

Other entrants
The following players received wildcards into the main draw:
  Eugenie Bouchard 
  Victoria Duval
  Madison Keys
  Anett Kontaveit
  Garbiñe Muguruza
  Andrea Petkovic
  Monica Puig
  Ajla Tomljanović

The following player received entry using a protected ranking into the main draw:
  Alexandra Dulgheru

The following players received entry from the qualifying draw:
  Mallory Burdette
  Jana Čepelová
  Melinda Czink
  Allie Kiick
  Bethanie Mattek-Sands
  Shahar Pe'er
  Karolína Plíšková
  Yulia Putintseva
  Kateřina Siniaková
  Sílvia Soler Espinosa
  Donna Vekić
  Stefanie Vögele
The following players received entry as lucky loser:
  Lauren Davis

Withdrawals
 Before the tournament
  Victoria Azarenka (right ankle injury) → replaced by  Lauren Davis
  Petra Cetkovská → replaced by  Kimiko Date-Krumm
  Kaia Kanepi → replaced by  Pauline Parmentier
  Samantha Stosur (right calf injury) → replaced by  Camila Giorgi
 During the tournament 
  Venus Williams  (lower back injury)

Retirements
  Marion Bartoli (left foot injury)
  Anna Tatishvili (left ankle injury)

Women's doubles

Seeds

1 Rankings as of March 18, 2013.

Other entrants
The following pairs received wildcards into the doubles main draw:
  Madison Keys /  Ajla Tomljanović
  Svetlana Kuznetsova /  Flavia Pennetta
  Garbiñe Muguruza /  Francesca Schiavone
  Lisa Raymond /  Laura Robson
The following pair received entry as alternates:
  Tatjana Malek /  Tamarine Tanasugarn

Withdrawals
 Before the tournament
  Heather Watson (left adductor injury)
 During the tournament
  María José Martínez Sánchez (left knee injury)

Finals

Men's singles

 Andy Murray defeated  David Ferrer, 2–6, 6–4, 7–6(7–1)

Women's singles

 Serena Williams defeated  Maria Sharapova, 4–6, 6–3, 6–0 
This was Williams' record sixth title, breaking Steffi Graf's record of five titles.

Men's doubles

  Aisam-ul-Haq Qureshi /  Jean-Julien Rojer defeated  Mariusz Fyrstenberg /  Marcin Matkowski, 6–4, 6–1

Women's doubles

 Nadia Petrova /  Katarina Srebotnik defeated  Lisa Raymond /  Laura Robson, 6–1, 7–6(7–2)

References

External links
Official Website

 
Miami Open (tennis)
Sony Open Tennis
Sony Open Tennis
Sony Open Tennis
Sony Open Tennis